Davis Lake is a lake in Deschutes and Klamath counties, Oregon, U.S.

Davis Lake may also refer to:
 Davis Lake (British Columbia), a lake in the Boundary Country near Greenwood
 Davis Lake Provincial Park, a park in British Columbia near the town of Mission
 Davis Lake in Faulkner County, Arkansas
 Davis Lake in Howard County, Arkansas
 Davis Lake in Lonoke County, Arkansas
 Davis Lake in Miller County, Arkansas
 Davis Lake in Ouachita County, Arkansas
 Davis Lake in Pulaski County, Arkansas
 Davis Lake in Stone County, Arkansas
 Davis Lakes, a lake in Utah
 Davis Lake Community, a residential neighborhood in Charlotte, North Carolina.

See also
 Davis Lake volcanic field in Oregon
Elmer Davis Lake in Kentucky
Lake Davis (disambiguation)